TVCine is a Portuguese premium television brand used on four movie channels, operated by NOS. They showcase recent movies and premieres from all the major studios, as well as comedy, action, classic and old movies.

The TVCine brand was launched on November 1, 2007, replacing the Lusomundo branding of the channels that had been launched on June 1, 2003. In May, 2009, they started to broadcast in 16:9 24-hours a day, instead of the old 4:3 format.

As of September 1, 2015 TVSéries has granted HBO series exclusivity in Portugal and has adopted "Home of HBO" as its tagline, until the closure of the channel on January 14, 2020, due to the launch of HBO Portugal, which would eventually become HBO Max.

Channels 
 TVCine Top (replaced Lusomundo Premium, and more recently TVCine 1)
 TVCine Edition (replaced Lusomundo Action, and more recently TVCine 2)
 TVCine Emotion (replaced Lusomundo Happy, and more recently TVCine 3)
 TVCine Action (replaced Lusomundo Gallery, TVCine, and more recently TVCine 4)
 TVCine Top HD (replaced TVCine 4 HD, TVCine HD and TVCine 1 HD)
 TVCine Edition HD (replaced TVCine 2 HD)
 TVCine Emotion HD (replaced TVCine 3 HD)
 TVCine Action HD (replaced TVCine 2 HD)

Extinct Channels (on 14th January 2020) 
 TVSéries
 TVSéries HD

References

External links
Official TVCine site
Official ZON site

Movie channels in Portugal
Mass media in Portugal
Television networks in Portugal
Television stations in Portugal
Television channels and stations established in 1994
1994 establishments in Portugal